Moosbach is a municipality in the Braunau am Inn in the Austrian state of Upper Austria.

Geography
Moosbach lies 25 km west of Ried im Innkreis and 10 km southeast of Braunau am Inn between the Inn valley on the north, the Mattig on the west, and the Kobernauß forest on the south.

References

Cities and towns in Braunau am Inn District